The 1977 National Camogie League is a competition in the women's team field sport of camogie was won by Wexford, who defeated Cork in the final, played at Castleboro.

Arrangements
Cork, who did not compete in 1976-77, won the western zone with full points, defeating holders Tipperary, Clare, Galway and Limerick. Wexford lost in their first outing to Kilkenny, who in turn lost to Dublin, leaving all three counties on two points. In the play-offs Wexford then beat Kilkenny and Dublin but by the time these matches had been played, the final, fixed for mid-November had to be put forward to March. Wexford had beaten Cork by 3-8 to 1-3 in the open draw championship the previous July.

The Final
Bridget Doyle scored two goals as Wexford won the final by seven points. Agnes Hourigan wrote in the Irish Press: Last year’s runners-up became champions when they defeated a youthful and dashing Cork combination. Cork took some time to settle down. They were forced to make one change in their team before the start, Hannah Cortter replacing Margaret McCarthy. They had first class defenders in Marie Mackey and Betty Joyce, Pat Riordan and Pat Moloney were staunch worker sin centre field and Margarete O'Leary was a sharp-shooting quarter. Deirdre Cousins, Dorothy and Elsie Walsh and Kit Codd did well for the winners.Report of final in Irish Independent, March 6, 1978Report of final in Irish Examiner, March 6, 1978

Final stages

References

External links
 Camogie Association

1977 in camogie
1977
1978 in camogie